The Imitation Game is a British television game show presented by Alexander Armstrong and starring the impressionists Rory Bremner and Debra Stephenson.

Overview 
Each week, two teams (captained by Rory Bremner and Debra Stephenson) go head-to-head re-enacting iconic movie scenes, revoice news footage, cover songs and celebrity voiceovers. The impressions bring celebrities - such as Donald Trump and Holly Willoughby, Boris Johnson and Adele, and Russell Brand and Mary Berry - together into unexpected situations.

Episodes

Series 1 (2018)

Controversy 
Rory Bremner revealed in August 2018 that ITV producers had removed an impression of presenter Dale Winton from the programme, after he was found dead at his London home in April.

References

External links 

 The Imitation Game on IMDb

2018 British television series debuts
2018 British television series endings
2010s British game shows
ITV comedy
ITV panel games
British panel games
Television series by ITV Studios
Television series by Big Talk Productions
English-language television shows